Wugong County is a county under the administration of the prefecture-level city of Xianyang, in the central part of Shaanxi province, China. Tai was also one of the ancestral homes of the royal Ji clan of the Zhou dynasty.

Administrative divisions
As 2016, this County is divided to 8 towns.
Towns

Climate

References

External links 
 
 Official website of Wugong County Government

 
County-level divisions of Shaanxi